Pleasureland is a 2003 Channel 4 feature-length television drama focusing on a group of teenagers in Liverpool who feel pressured to grow up. Written by Helen Blakeman, directed by Brian Percival and produced by Kudos, the makers of the BBC One espionage series Spooks.

The drama was based on the John Adams opera Pleasureland and was filmed on location in Liverpool as part of the Channel 4's Adult at 14 season.

Plot 

A modern tale of teenage sex, Pleasureland is the story of Jo, a 14-year-old Scouser, who wakes up one day and decides she has to change her virgin status. In fact, she makes a promise to herself: 'I, Joanna Mosscroft, aged 14, year nine, almost year 10, promise me, Joanna Mosscroft, to have sex.' She is also motivated to have sex because it seems as if that is what all of the girls at school seem to be talking about. Thus, she feels pressured to lose her virginity. With that, she sets off on a rollercoaster journey of first-time-for-everything. Jo soon becomes embroiled in a world of sex, drugs and betrayal.

Cast 

 Katie Lyon as Joanna Mosscroft 
 Claire Hackett as Julie Mosscroft
 Michael Dunn as Greg Mosscroft
 Melissa Edwards as Michelle Mosscroft
 Michael Bailey as Greg Mosscroft
 Tara Wells as Katie 
 Leah Whittaker as Sophie 
 Claire Bailey as Lisa 
 Philip Olivier as Ben
 Barry Sloane as Darren 
 Holly Shwenn as Leanne 
 Letitia Denny as Chantelle 
 Mark Fenna as Rocky
 Clive Moore as Mr. Stevens
 Guy Parry as Guy in Bar
 Sarah Harvey as Train Girl

Critical Reception 
The show attracted criticism by children's campaigners over the way in which it depicted teenage sex.

Victoria Segal writing for The Times praised Katie Lyons performance as the protagonist and labelled her as 'one to watch'. She also selected Pleasureland as her 'Pick of the day' in the TV section of The Sunday Times on November 16, 2003, despite describing it as 'difficult and unpleasant viewing'.

Awards

References

External links 
 Pleasureland, Channel 4
 
 Article in the Observer
 Article in The Daily Post (Liverpool)

Channel 4 original programming
2003 television specials
Films about virginity
British television films
Films directed by Brian Percival